The French submarine Saphir was the lead ship of the s built for the French Navy in the mid-1930s. Laid down in May 1926, it was launched in December 1928 and commissioned in September 1930. Saphir was disarmed at Bizerte, Tunisia and renamed FR 112 after being captured there by Italian forces on 8 December 1942. Saphir was seized and scuttled by German forces at Naples, Italy on 15 September 1943.

Design
Propulsion while surfaced was provided by two  Normand-Vickers diesel motors and while submerged two  electric motors. The submarines electrical propulsion allowed it to attain speeds of  while submerged.

The Saphir-class submarines were constructed to be able to launch torpedoes and lay mines without surfacing. They were attached to the submarine's exterior under a hydrodynamic protection and were jettisoned with compressed air. The Saphir-class submarines also featured an automatic depth regulator that automatically flooded ballast tanks after mines were dropped to prevent the risk of the submarine surfacing in the middle of enemy waters.

See also 

 List of submarines of France
 French submarines of World War II

Citations

References 

Submarines of France
World War II submarines of France
Saphir-class submarines (1928)
1928 ships